Joaquín Gabriel Trasante Hernández (born 14 March 1999) is a Uruguayan professional footballer who plays as a midfielder for Nacional.

Club career
A youth academy graduate of Nacional, Trasante was part of club's under-20 team which won 2018 U-20 Copa Libertadores. He made his professional debut on 2 February 2020 in a 4–2 Supercopa Uruguaya defeat against Liverpool Montevideo.

International career
Trasante is a former Uruguay youth international.

Career statistics

Honours
Nacional U20
U-20 Copa Libertadores: 2018

Nacional
Uruguayan Primera División: 2020, 2022
Supercopa Uruguaya: 2021

Uruguay U20
 South American Games silver medal: 2018

References

External links
 

1999 births
Living people
Association football midfielders
Uruguayan footballers
Uruguayan Primera División players
Club Nacional de Football players
South American Games silver medalists for Uruguay
South American Games medalists in football